The women's curling tournament of the 2014 Winter Olympics was held at the Ice Cube Curling Center in Sochi, Russia on 10–20 February 2014. Ten nations competed in the round robin preliminary round, and the top four nations at the conclusion of the round robin qualified for the medal round. South Korea made their Olympic debut in curling.

A new Olympic record was established when Great Britain scored seven points in one end against the United States. Great Britain also equalled the record for total points scored in one game, scoring twelve points against the United States and against Japan. Canada, skipped by Jennifer Jones, became the first women's rink to go through an Olympic tournament undefeated. Great Britain, by winning the bronze medal became the youngest rink to ever step onto an Olympic curling podium.

Teams
The teams are listed as follows:

Round robin standings

Round robin results
All draw times are listed in Moscow Time (UTC+4).

Summary

Draw 1
Monday, 10 February, 14:00

Draw 2
Tuesday, 11 February, 09:00

Draw 3
Tuesday, 11 February, 19:00

Draw 4
Wednesday, 12 February, 14:00

Draw 5
Thursday, 13 February, 09:00

Draw 6
Thursday, 13 February, 19:00

Draw 7
Friday, 14 February, 14:00

Draw 8
Saturday, 15 February, 09:00

Draw 9
Saturday, 15 February, 19:00

Draw 10
Sunday, 16 February, 14:00

Draw 11
Monday, 17 February, 09:00

Draw 12
Monday, 17 February, 19:00

Playoffs

Semifinals
Wednesday, 19 February, 14:00

Bronze medal game
Thursday, 20 February, 12:30

Gold medal game
Thursday, 20 February, 17:30

References

Curling at the 2014 Winter Olympics
Women's curling at the 2014 Winter Olympics
2014 in Russian women's sport
2014 in women's curling
Women's events at the 2014 Winter Olympics